The Australian Football League registered the name Western Sydney Football Club Ltd with the Australian Securities and Investments Commission in January 2008. On 12 March 2008 the AFL received unanimous support from the existing 16 clubs for two expansion teams to enter the league, one of which was to be based in western Sydney. The Western Sydney working party met on 22 July to discuss player rules and draft concessions.

The Australian Football League Commission continued to delay their final decision on the new western Sydney franchise throughout 2008 before announcing a $100 million redevelopment of Sydney Showground Stadium on 15 November.

Team GWS also announced former Essendon senior coach Kevin Sheedy was officially announced as Greater Western Sydney's inaugural head coach on 9 November 2009.

Acceptance
On 29 July 2010 AFL Chief Executive Andrew Demetriou announced that the Greater Western Sydney bid team had been granted a provisional license to enter the league in 2012 and would become the eighteenth team in the Australian Football League.

2010: TAC Cup
Greater Western Sydney were permitted to use any player under the age of 18 from New South Wales, Australian Capital Territory and Northern Territory to compete for the team in their TAC Cup year. The team played its first competitive game in the TAC Cup against the Northern Knights on 3 April. The Knights would belt GWS by 94 points at Blacktown Olympic Park.

On 1 June the club announced the signings of their first three players in the form of zone selections Curtly Hampton, Mark Whiley and Sam Schulz. On the same day, the club also announced the signing of professional rugby league footballer Israel Folau. Folau's three-year contract with GWS would begin in 2011 as they team entered the North East Australian Football League.

On 16 November the club revealed their guernseys and their nickname of the "Giants".

2011: NEAFL
The Greater Western Sydney Football Club were permitted access to a dozen 17-year-olds throughout Australia that would compete for the club in their NEAFL year. The list of the 12 selected players was revealed in December 2010, which included Tomas Bugg (Gippsland), Jeremy Cameron (North Ballarat), Sam Darley (North Hobart), Josh Growden (Woodville-West Torrens), Jarrod Harding (Woodville-West Torrens), Jack Hombsch (Sturt), Tim Golds (Oakleigh), Dylan Shiel (Dandenong), Adam Treloar (Dandenong), Simon Tunbridge (Perth), Gerald Ugle (Perth) and Nathan Wilson (Peel). The club also attempted to relocate Swan Districts 16-year-old Stephen Coniglio to join the club for their NEAFL season, as the Gold Coast did 12 months previous with David Swallow. The AFL did not allow the move as Coniglio had not finished his year 12 studies.

2012–2013: AFL Development Years

2012: Inaugural season
As a part of the concessions package on entry to the AFL, the Giants were permitted to sign up to sixteen off contract players at other clubs. Adelaide defender Phil Davis made history on 2 August 2011 when he became the first AFL contracted player to sign for the Giants. Further signings included Callan Ward (Western Bulldogs), Rhys Palmer (Fremantle Dockers), Tom Scully (Melbourne Demons) and Sam Reid (Western Bulldogs). Further concessions were given to the club during the 2011 AFL Draft when they received nine of the first fifteen picks. The picks were used to acquire Jonathan Patton (1), Stephen Coniglio (2), Dom Tyson (3), Will Hoskin-Elliott (4), Matt Buntine (5), Nick Haynes (7), Adam Tomlinson (9), Liam Sumner (10), Toby Greene (11), Taylor Adams (13) and Devon Smith (14).

2013: Emergence of Jeremy Cameron

In Round 6 the Giants looked to cause a major upset when they led the undefeated Essendon Bombers at half time by 23 points at Etihad Stadium. Giants forward Jeremy Cameron kicked a club record six goals in the game but a strong finish from Essendon prevented the Giants from securing their first win of the season.

Cameron's goal kicking feats were so impressive that he found himself tied first in the Coleman Medal race with Jarryd Roughead and Josh Kennedy following a two-goal effort against Brisbane in Round 21.

2014–present: The Big Three
The Giants entered the 2014 AFL season with three high-profile forwards after securing Tom Boyd with the number one pick in the 2013 AFL Draft. Boyd, along with 2011 number one draft pick Jonathan Patton and Jeremy Cameron, who finished third in the 2013 Coleman Medal race, were heralded by the media as "The Big Three". The club also recruited premiership players Josh Hunt, Shane Mumford and Heath Shaw during the 2013 trade period in an attempt to add experience to the youthful team.

References

Greater Western Sydney Giants
History of Australian rules football
Greater Western Sydney Giants